Shakeel Hussain Khan (born 11 March 1977) is a Pakistani actor who appears in theatre, television series and films.

Life and career 
Shakeel Hussain Khan was born on 11  March 1977 in Karachi, Pakistan. He began his career as a theatre actor and has played various playwrights including The Boor by Anton Chekhov, Die Räuber by Friedrich Schiller, Les Fourberies de Scapin by Molière and Karachi: The Musical by Nida Butt.

He has appeared in various television series in Pakistan. Khan gained public recognition with the television series Heer (2016) in which he played role of 'Paiji' as lead negative. His work in television includes Kash Mey Teri Beti Na Hoti (2012), Kisay Apna Kahain (2014), Aik Pal (2014), Code Name Red (2014), Jannat Ki Hawas (2014), Tootay Huay Taray (2014), Kharaash (2015).

Khan made his Lollywood debut in the film O21 (2014) which was directed by Jami Mehmood. He also appeared in Maalik (2016) in which he played role of Musa.

Filmography

Television

References 

1977 births
Living people